Lee Kwang-soo (born July 14, 1985) is a South Korean actor, entertainer, and model. He made his acting debut in the sitcom Here He Comes (2008) and received further recognition for his roles in medical melodrama It's Okay, That's Love (2014), neo-noir film Confession (2014), black comedy film Collective Invention (2015), sitcom The Sound of Your Heart (2016), and drama Live (2018), and human comedy film Inseparable Bros (2019).

Lee was a regular cast member of the South Korean variety show Running Man from June 2010 until May 2021. His last appearance on Running Man was aired on June 13, 2021.

Early life and education 
Lee was born on July 14, 1985, in Namyangju, Gyeonggi, South Korea.

Career
Lee began his entertainment career as a model in 2007. He made his acting debut in the 2008 sitcom Here He Comes, which was followed by High Kick Through the Roof.

Lee's popularity increased after joining SBS' Good Sunday variety show Running Man, gaining the nickname "Prince of Asia" due to his large number of overseas fans. In 2010 and 2011, Lee won back-to-back awards at the SBS Entertainment Awards for "New Star Award" and "Best Newcomer in Variety", respectively.

In 2012, Lee played supporting roles in the romantic comedies Wonderful Radio and All About My Wife, and thriller The Scent. Later in the year, he reunited onscreen with his former Running Man co-star and real-life best friend Song Joong-ki in the TV melodrama The Innocent Man.

In 2013, after another supporting role in A Wonderful Moment, Lee voiced the lead character Marco in the animated movie Maritime Police Marco, opposite fellow Running Man regular Song Ji-hyo, who voiced for Lulu.

Lee had publicly stated that he wanted to play an antagonist in TV or film. He was then cast as Prince Imhae (villainous brother to King Gwanghae) in the 2013 period drama Goddess of Fire. While filming Goddess of Fire, he participated in an energy conservation campaign alongside child actress Kim Yoo-bin.

On August 17, 2013, Lee held his first solo fan meeting of his career in Singapore. Attended by 2,000 fans, it was considered a success. He held another one in Malaysia on January 4, 2014, attended by almost 3,000 fans.

In 2014, Lee played his first major role on the big screen in Confession. The neo-noir film is about three friends (played by Ji Sung, Ju Ji-hoon, and Lee) whose friendship gets destroyed after getting involved in a murder case. He then returned to television with the medical melodrama It's Okay, That's Love, playing a patient suffering from Tourette syndrome, a neurological disorder characterized by repetitive, stereotyped, involuntary movements and vocalizations called tics. Lee then starred in the film A Dynamite Family, about five bickering brothers living in the village of Deoksu.

In 2015, Lee played the protagonist in Collective Invention, whose condition is caused by side effects from a newly introduced drug. Collective Invention was screened in the Vanguard section of the 2015 Toronto International Film Festival, marking Lee's first red carpet appearance at an international film festival. He also starred in the two-episode drama Puck!, where he played a loan shark who joins a college ice hockey club. The one-act play was aired on January 1, 2016. The same year, he was appointed ambassador of the "2015 Korea Brand & Entertainment Expo" and received commendation from the trade minister for boosting the Korean Wave industry.

In 2016, Lee starred in tvN's Entourage, a South Korean remake of the American series. He was then cast in the KBS sitcom The Sound of Your Heart, based on the webtoon of the same name. The web drama was a success in both South Korea and China, gaining 100 million on Sohu TV and ranked No. 1 among Korean dramas on the site.

In September 2017, it was confirmed that Lee would be a fixed cast member in Netflix's variety show Busted!.

In 2018, Lee starred in Noh Hee-kyung's slice-of-life Live playing a police officer who tries to uphold values in everyday life and maintain justice. The drama was a success and Lee received rave reviews for his performance. He then played a Mensa genius in crime comedy The Accidental Detective 2: In Action, a sequel to the 2015 film.

In 2019, Lee starred in human comedy Inseparable Bros and gambling film Tazza: One Eyed Jack. He won his first Baeksang Arts Awards award for Best Supporting Actor for his outstanding portrayal of Park Dong-goo who suffers from severe intellectual disabilities in Inseparable Bros, with critics citing "it was like seeing Dustin Hoffman in Rain Man". The same year, he was cast in disaster comedy film Sinkhole alongside Cha Seung-won and Kim Sung-kyun.

On February 15, 2020, Lee was involved in a car accident which put all of his activities on pause until his recovery from ankle injury. Later in June, it was confirmed that he would be starring in The Pirates: The Last Royal Treasure, a sequel to the 2014 film. The film was released in January 2022.

In 2021, Lee returned to the Season 3 of Netflix variety show Busted!. Later in April 2021, Lee confirmed the film A Year-End Medley, which was released in the same year. On April 27, 2021, Lee's agency announced that he will be stepping down from Running Man to focus on treatment and recovery from the accident. His last recording took place on May 24, 2021.

In 2022, Lee will star in the tvN drama The Killer's Shopping List, marking his return to the small screen after four years.

Personal life
On December 31, 2018, it was reported that Lee had been dating actress Lee Sun-bin, with King Kong by Starship stating that the couple had been dating "for 5 months" prior to the announcement of their relationship.

Filmography

Film

Television series

Web series

Television show

Web show

Music video appearances

Discography

Ambassadorship 
 Korea-Mekong Ambassador (2021)

Awards and nominations

State honors

Listicles

Notes

References

External links 
 
 
 
 

1985 births
Living people
People from Namyangju
King Kong by Starship artists
South Korean male film actors
South Korean male television actors
South Korean male web series actors
Dong-ah Institute of Media and Arts alumni
21st-century South Korean male actors
South Korean television personalities
The Amazing Race contestants
Best Supporting Actor Paeksang Arts Award (film) winners